Paul Mayer may refer to:

 Paul Mayer (activist) (1931–2013), American peace activist
 Paul Mayer (zoologist) (1848–1923), German zoologist known for study of marine life
 Paul Augustin Mayer (1911–2010), German cardinal of the Roman Catholic Church
 Paul Avila Mayer (1928–2009), American television writer and producer

See also
 Paul Meyer (disambiguation)
 Paul Meier (disambiguation)